María de Lourdes is a Spanish feminine given name taken from Our Lady of Lourdes a title of the Virgin Mary

Those with the name include:
María de Lourdes (singer) (1939-1997)
María de Lourdes Amaya 1980) is a Mexican politician affiliated to the PRD
María de Lourdes Santiago a lawyer and journalist from Adjuntas, Puerto Rico
María de Lourdes Ramos Rivera (1960) Puerto Rican politician
Maria de Lourdes Belchior Pontes (1923-1998) was a Portuguese writer, poet, professor and diplomat.
Maria de Lourdes Martins (1926–2009) was a Portuguese pianist and composer.
Maria de Lourdes Teixeira (1907–1989) was a Brazilian writer, translator, biographer and journalist.

Spanish feminine given names